In orbital mechanics, a circumlunar trajectory, trans-lunar trajectory or lunar free return is a type of free return trajectory which takes a spacecraft from Earth, around the far side of the Moon, and back to Earth using only gravity once the initial trajectory is set.

History

The first spacecraft to fly a circumlunar trajectory was Luna 3. Circumlunar trajectories were also used by Apollo missions prior to lunar orbit insertion, to provide a free return to Earth in the event of a propulsion system malfunction on the way to the Moon. This was used on Apollo 13, when an oxygen tank rupture necessitated return to Earth without firing the Service Module engine, although a number of course corrections using the Lunar Module descent engine were used to refine the trajectory.

A number of proposed, but not flown, crewed missions have been planned to intentionally conduct circumlunar flybys, including the Soviet Soyuz 7K-L1 or Zond programme, and several US proposals, including Gemini-Centaur and an early Apollo proposal.

The latest circumlunar mission was 2022 NASA Artemis 1.

Planned
The dearMoon project is planned as a 2023 circumlunar flight using the SpaceX Starship to carry approximately 10 tourists on a multiday flight to the Moon and back.

See also
 Free-return trajectory
 Trans-lunar injection

References

Exploration of the Moon